The 2019–20 season was the second season in the top Ukrainian football league for FC Desna Chernihiv. Desna competed in Premier League, Ukrainian Cup. After finishing at 4th place in Premier League Desna qualified for European club tournament for the next season for the first time in clubs history.

Players

Squad information

Transfers

In

Out

Pre-season and friendlies

Competitions

Overall

Premier League

League table

Results summary

Results by round

Matches

Ukrainian Cup

Statistics

Appearances and goals

|-
! colspan=16 style=background:#dcdcdc; text-align:center| Goalkeepers

|-
! colspan=16 style=background:#dcdcdc; text-align:center| Defenders

|-
! colspan=16 style=background:#dcdcdc; text-align:center| Midfielders 

|-
! colspan=16 style=background:#dcdcdc; text-align:center| Forwards

|-
! colspan=16 style=background:#dcdcdc; text-align:center| Players transferred out during the season

Last updated: 19 July 2020

Goalscorers

Last updated: 19 July 2020

Clean sheets

Last updated: 19 July 2020

Disciplinary record

Last updated: 19 July 2020

Attendances

Last updated: 19 July 2020

References

External links
 Official website

FC Desna Chernihiv
Desna Chernihiv
FC Desna Chernihiv seasons